Rajasansi is a town, near Amritsar city and a nagar panchayat in Amritsar district in the Indian state of Punjab. Sri Guru Ram Dass Jee International Airport (Amritsar International Airport) is located in Rajasansi village on Ajnala-Rajasansi Road. Raja Sansi Assembly Constituency is also an assembly segment in the Punjab Legislative Assembly, which is currently represented by Sukhbinder Singh Sarkaria.

Demographics

 India census, Rajasansi had a population of 12,131. Males constitute 54% of the population and females 46%.  In Rajasansi, 13% of the population is under 6 years of age.

Climate
The official weather station for the village is the Civil Aerodrome. Weather records here date back to 15 November 1947.

Politics 
The city is part of the Raja Sansi Assembly Constituency.

Gallery

See also
 Misl

References

Cities and towns in Amritsar district